The Djiru, otherwise spelt Jirru, Are an Aboriginal Australian people whose traditional lands are along the coasts of Northern Queensland, mainly the area around Mission Beach.

Language
Djiru is a dialect of the Dyirbal language

Country
The Djiru, a rain-forest people, occupy a large part of the coastal area now called Cassowary Coast. Norman Tindale estimate their lands as covering some  around Clump Point and as far north as Murdering Point. Their southern extension runs to the mouth of the Tully River.

Social organisation
Two names noted down in a list of Queensland tribes compiled by William Parry-Okeden arguably refer, not to distinct tribes, but to Djiru hordes:-
 Boolboora
 Warryboora

History
The first dispute with settlers occurred in 1872 when the survivors of the ship "Maria" that was shipwrecked near Johnstone River on the coast. Sub-Inspector Robert Johnstone led a search party to look for survivors and to punish the Mamu who had abused them. Commanding Native Police troopers, he systematically shot any Djiru encountered in his long beach trek and burnt their dwellings.

The Hull River Aboriginal Settlement, an Aboriginal reserve, was built on Djiru land at Mission Beach in 1914, with Aboriginal people brought from surrounding areas to live there for their "protection" or disciplinary reasons, under the Aboriginals Protection and Restriction of the Sale of Opium Act 1897. The settlement was destroyed by a huge cyclone in 1918, with surviving residents being transferred to the new reserve on Great Palm Island.

Last members
The last speakers of the language were Joe Jamboree (Joe Tambourine?) and Pompey Clumppoint, the latter from Clump Point opposite Dunk Island. Pompey had been incarcerated on Palm Island for an incident of cannibalism in 1920. According to him the best-tasting human flesh was Chinese, followed by Aboriginal and, last, the otherwise tough and bitter flesh of Englishmen.

Alternative names
 Djirubagala, Dyirubagala
 Dyiru
 Gerrah
 Gillah
 Iimba

Source:

Notes

Citations

Sources

Aboriginal peoples of Queensland
Far North Queensland